Homay-e Sofla (also Romanized as Homāy-e Soflá; also known as Homā-ye Pā’īn, Homāy-e Pā’īn, Homā-ye Soflá, Homāy Pā’īn, Umai, Ūmay, and Umay-Ashaga) is a village in Sina Rural District, in the Central District of Varzaqan County, East Azerbaijan Province, Iran. At the 2006 census, its population was 205, in 46 families.

References 

Towns and villages in Varzaqan County